Sébastien Gattuso (born 28 June 1971) is a Monegasque athlete specializing in the 100 metres.

Career
He was born in Menton, France. In 2006 he was banned for six months after testing positive for finasteride, a drug that can be used to mask use of steroids.

Participating in the 2004 Summer Olympics, he achieved seventh place in his hundred metres heat, thus failing to secure qualification for the second round. He ran the 100 metres in 10.58 seconds, which was a personal best time and national record.

He also competed at the 2002 European Championships, the 2003 World Championships, the 2003 World Indoor Championships and the 2007 European Indoor Championships without reaching the final.

Participating in the 2008 Summer Olympics, he ran 10.70 for sixth place in his hundred metres heat and failed to secure qualification for the second round.

His current personal best time is 10.57 seconds, achieved in June 2007 in Marseille. This is also the Monegasque record. He also holds the national records in 60 metres (6.94 s), 200 metres and shot put.

Gattuso also competed in bobsleigh in two Winter Olympics, earning his best finish of 19th in the two-man event at Vancouver in 2010. His best result at the FIBT World Championships was tenth in the four-man event at St. Moritz in 2007. The best World Cup finish for Gattuso was sixth in a two-man event at Cesana Pariol in 2007.

References
 
 
 

1971 births
Living people
People from Menton
Athletes (track and field) at the 2004 Summer Olympics
Athletes (track and field) at the 2008 Summer Olympics
Bobsledders at the 2002 Winter Olympics
Bobsledders at the 2010 Winter Olympics
Bobsledders at the 2014 Winter Olympics
Doping cases in athletics
Doping cases in bobsleigh
Monegasque male sprinters
Monegasque male bobsledders
Monegasque sportspeople in doping cases
Olympic athletes of Monaco
Olympic bobsledders of Monaco
Sportspeople from Alpes-Maritimes